The Wales national under-17 football team is the national under-17 football team of Wales and is controlled by the Football Association of Wales. The team competes in the UEFA European Under-17 Championship held every year.

Competitive record

FIFA Under-17 World Cup
 1985–1989: Did not Enter
 1991–2019: Did not Qualify

UEFA Under-16 Championships
 1982–1989 did not enter
 1990–2001 did not qualify

UEFA Under-17 Championships
 2002 Qualifying Round
 2003 Elite Round
 2004 Elite Round
 2005 Qualifying Round
 2006 Elite Round
 2007 Elite Round
 2008 Elite Round
 2009 Elite Round
 2010 Elite Round
 2011 Qualifying Round
 2012 Elite Round
 2013 Qualifying Round
 2014 Elite Round
 2015 Elite Round
 2016 Elite Round
 2017 Qualifying Round
 2018 Qualifying Round
 2019 Qualifying Round
 2020 Cancelled due to the COVID-19 pandemic
 2021 Cancelled due to the COVID-19 pandemic
 2022 Elite Round
 2023 To be determined

Current squad
 The following players were called up for the 2023 UEFA European Under-17 Championship Elite Round matches.
 Match dates: 22,25,28 March 2023
 Opposition: ,  and Caps and goals correct as of:''' 28 September 2022, after the match against

See also
 UEFA European Under-17 Championship
 Football Association of Wales
 Wales national football team
 Wales national under-21 football team
 Wales national under-20 football team
 Wales national under-19 football team
 Wales national under-18 football team

References

F
European national under-17 association football teams
Youth football in Wales